Lee Ann Womack is the debut studio album by the American country music singer of the same name. The album was certified gold by the RIAA on January 16, 1998 and platinum on September 24, 1999. Hits that appeared on the Billboard Hot Country Singles chart were "Never Again, Again" which peaked at #23, "The Fool" and "You've Got to Talk to Me" both at #2, and "Buckaroo" at #27. The album itself topped out at #9 on the Top Country Albums chart.

Background
Womack told The Dallas Morning News, "Success doesn't really surprise me because it always goes in cycles and comes back around to country. I was fortunate to be the one that they decided to open the door for a little bit, the one they allowed to do this traditional thing." In another interview with The Dallas Morning News Womack revealed she recorded the album while her marriage was falling apart and said, "I hate to say that it was a bonus, but as terrible as it was - and it was going on while I was picking songs, while we were cutting the tracks, while I was doing vocals - I do think that pain did come across. I try not to pick songs that I can't deliver, that I don't understand, that I've not been through. The one thing that I want people to say about my music is that it's real."

Womack told Billboard, "I wanted Mark Wright to produce me, because of that full, fat sound he gets."

Critical reception

David Zimmerman of USA Today gave the album three and a half stars and wrote, "Womack is a deep-country
singer whose skill with heartbreak and confessional songs will prompt Lorrie Morgan comparisons. Womack is at her best immersed
in hurting ballads like The Fool, but the truly beautiful song here is the old-fashioned duet Make Memories With Me,
in which she holds her own with Mark Chesnutt as he pulls out his best heart-tugger vocal tricks. Billy Kennedy of the Belfast News Letter wrote, "She combines tears and torment in her songs with some light-hearted lyrics and Nashville DJs who normally show a preference for crossover material have really taken to her." Editors at Billboard gave the album a positive review and wrote, "This is a beacon for country music's journey out of the desert and into the Promised Land. Great voice, great songs, and great production make this one of the most impressive debut albums in some time. Lee Ann Womack pays homage to country's rich tradition without sounding retro. She can handle hard-driving, truck-driving tunes, gospel songs, and tender ballads with equal aplomb here." Mario Tarradel of The Dallas Morning News listed the album as the best country album of 1997 and wrote, "Country music should have heart, grit, emotion and realism. It should offer universal truths in four gripping minutes. Lee Ann Womack's first album delivers country's hallmarks with elegance and poignancy." Dene Hallam of KKBQ said, "The singing is extraordinary, the material is extraordinary, and Mark Wright has produced the album of his life. I would be surprised if this album doesn't go triple-platinum." Alanna Nash of Entertainment Weekly gave the album an A rating and wrote, "This native of Jacksonville, Tex., has more heart than any other new female country singer, and a passel of traditional-sounding songs that may just be good enough to turn Nashville's commercial tide. David Hajdu also of Entertainment Weekly listed the album  as one of the top of 1997 and wrote,  If country had a breakthrough female this year, it was Womack, who combined Dolly's tremolo, Tammy's sob, and Reba's elongated vowels into a fetching tradition-based style. Her success--she's just gone gold--could help turn Nashville back to its hard-country roots. Thom Owens of AllMusic gave the album three stars and wrote, " The slick, professional production helps make this self-titled album a pleasant listen, despite the fairly uneven songwriting, and Womack certainly has a voice that can make the mediocre sound appealing, which results in a winning debut."

Track listing

Personnel
Compiled from liner notes.
Mike Brignardello – bass guitar
Tony Brown – piano on "You've Got to Talk to Me"
Larry Byrom – electric guitar on "Make Memories with Me"
Mark Chesnutt – duet vocals on "Make Memories with Me"
Pat Flynn – acoustic guitar
Larry Franklin – fiddle, mandolin
Paul Franklin – steel guitar
Abe Manuel – accordion
Brent Mason – electric guitar
Steve Nathan – piano, Wurlitzer electric piano, Hammond B-3 organ
Tom Roady – percussion
Gary W. Smith – piano on "Get Up in Jesus' Name"
Biff Watson – acoustic guitar
Lonnie Wilson – drums
Lee Ann Womack – lead vocals

Background vocals
Liana Manis
Gene Miller
John Wesley Ryles
Leslie Satcher
Lisa Silver
Ricky Skaggs
Sharon White Skaggs
Bergen White
Lee Ann Womack
Curtis Young

Strings performed by the Nashville String Machine, conducted by Carl Gorodetzky and arranged by Bergen White

Production
Produced By Mark Wright
Engineered By Robert Charles, Greg Droman, Jason Garner & Joe Hayden
Mixed By Tim Coyle & Greg Droman
Mastered By Hank Williams

Charts

Weekly charts

Year-end charts

References

1997 debut albums
Decca Records albums
Lee Ann Womack albums
Albums produced by Mark Wright (record producer)